22nd FFCC Awards
December 23, 2017

Best Picture:
Dunkirk

The 22nd Florida Film Critics Circle Awards were held on December 23, 2017.

The nominations were announced on December 20, 2017, led by The Shape of Water with nine nominations.

Winners and nominees

Winners are listed at the top of each list in bold, while the runner-ups for each category are listed under them.

References

External links
 

2017 film awards
2010s